TVB Jadeworld was a broadcasting station based in Sydney, Australia that caters for the Chinese community in Australia. It currently consists of 16 channels, with many programs relayed from TVB operations in Hong Kong and Taiwan.

As of 31 July 2017, the satellite broadcast service of those channels was ceased and replaced by the service by TVB Anywhere.

Current channel line-up

History 
Jadeworld began as JEDi (Jade Entertainment Digital Interactive) in 2000, broadcasting only 8 channels- 

CCTV-4 was added in 2000, while CNBC Asia was taken off the channels in 2001. 
JET-TV was offered to certain plan subscribers from until 2005. 
The addition of Dragon TV, Hunan TV, Chonqing TV and Phoenix TV in 2006-07 caters for subscribers of Mainland descent.

In May 2017, Jadeworld reduced to 26 channels.

See also

Subscription television in Australia

References

External links

Australian subscription television services
TVB channels
Television channels and stations established in 1998
Chinese-Australian culture
Overseas Chinese organisations
Television channels and stations disestablished in 2017
Ethnic mass media in Australia